Barry E. Kelly is a radiologist and university professor in medicine from Northern Ireland.

Career
Barry Kelly was born in Belfast where he attended St. Mary's Christian Brothers' Grammar School, Belfast.  He then attended the medical school at Queen's University, Belfast from which he graduated in 1984.  He obtained specialist training in surgery obtaining fellowships of the relevant royal colleges FRCSEd, FFRRCSI.

He subsequently moved into radiology and received training and qualification (FRCR). He was appointed as consultant radiologist to the Belfast Trust in 1995. He was appointed Visiting Professor of Radiology at Ulster University.

His radiological interests include imaging in acute medicine, surgery, trauma and the ICU environment.

Publications
 The History of Medicine, Money, and Politics: Riding the Rollercoaster of State Medicine. Ulster Medical Journal, 01 Jan 2009, 78(1):77-77.
 Abdominal x rays made easy: iatrogenic, accidental, and incidental objects, BMJ.

Honorary positions
 Dean, Faculty of Radiologists, RCSI (2012-2014)
 Editor, Ulster Medical Journal (2011- 2015)

References

1966 births
Living people
People educated at St. Mary's Christian Brothers' Grammar School, Belfast
Alumni of Queen's University Belfast
Fellows of the Royal College of Radiologists
Radiologists from Northern Ireland